Vera Cornish was a British stage and film actress Born 1893 died 1945? Spouse Kenneth Webb Married London 1914.

Selected filmography
 A London Flat Mystery (1915)
 Broken Barrier (1917)
 The Woman Wins (1918)
 Won by a Head (1920)

References

External links
 

Year of birth unknown
Year of death unknown
British film actresses
British silent film actresses
British stage actresses
20th-century British actresses